The Niwen (also known as Einigs Alichji) is a mountain of the Bernese Alps, overlooking the Rhone in the upper canton of Valais. It lies in the massif that separates the valley of Leukerbad from the lower Lötschental and that culminates at the Ferdenrothorn.

References

External links
 Niwen on Hikr

Mountains of the Alps
Mountains of Switzerland
Mountains of Valais
Two-thousanders of Switzerland